Pogo is an Indian cable and satellite television channel owned and operated by Warner Bros. Discovery India under its International division, as part of Cartoon Network India as the network's sister channel. It was launched on 1 January 2004. Broadcasting primarily animated programming, Pogo is Turner's South Asia-exclusive children's television network.

A timeshift version is available for Nepal, Bhutan, and Sri Lanka. Pogo is available as a block in Bangladesh and Pakistan on Cartoon Network, and in Thailand on Family Channel 13.

History

2004–2010

Pogo was officially launched on 1 January 2004 by Turner International India. After its launch, the channel primarily broadcast programming from Cartoon Network and Boomerang such as Tweenies, Beakman's World and Looney Tunes, Scooby-Doo. On 1 March 2005, Pogo launched Takeshi's Castle in which Bollywood personality and anchor, Jaaved Jaaferi gives commentary.

2010–2013
In 2010, Pogo began focusing more on live action programming than animated series. In 2011, Pogo began to compete with its sister channel Cartoon Network in ratings. The channel began airing shows such as Batman, The Powerpuff Girls, and more. Pogo acquired the rights of Chhota Bheem and subsequently began airing the show, which became hugely successful in India. In 2012, Pogo became leading kids channel in India by surpassing its sister channel Cartoon Network in ratings and enjoyed to be the No. 1 kids channel in India. Chhota Bheem proven to be huge success for Pogo. The channel started airing more local shows including Chhota Bheem.

In February 2013, the Government of Bangladesh banned the broadcast of Pogo in the country, as it was accused of broadcasting there without authorization. The Indian feeds of Disney Channel and Disney XD were also banned in Bangladesh as they were accused of broadcasting in Hindi throughout the day.

2014–2017

 
In 2016, Pogo rebranded with a new logo and look and the premiere of Yo-kai Watch on 11 January and Tashi on 23 January. The channel began classic shows from Hanna Barbera, such as Tom and Jerry and Scooby-Doo!.

In 2017, Grizzy and the Lemmings started to air on the channel on 2 January, Oddbods on 9 January and Andy Pirki on 3 December.

2018–2021
In 2018, Pogo started more focus on Chhota Bheem, Mighty Raju, Tik Tak Tail, etc. and hence stopped some of the international shows.

Pogo broadcast mostly Indian series and some international shows. From 2019 to 2020, the channel shifted its focus to Indian animation.

Pogo TV became the third most watched kids channel across all genres with TRP in December 2020.

In 2020, Pogo stopped all international shows and aired only Indian Animations like Chhota Bheem, Dabangg, Roll No 21, Lambuji Tinguji and Bandbudh Aur Budbak.

Pogo aired an animated movie Shaktimaan New TV Special on 14 November 2021. A Telugu-language audio track was added again to Pogo on 30 November 2021.

2022–present
In 2022, Pogo resumed airing international shows such as Grizzy and the Lemmings, Mr. Bean: The Animated Series and Yo-kai Watch.

On 22 August 2022, Ekans - Snakes Awake, an original animated series of Cartoon Network (India) was shifted on Pogo TV.
On 4 September 2022 the channel premiered its special episode titled Ekans: Origin Story. The channel also launched an original movie of that series titled Ekans: The Mystery Of Three Gems on October 9, 2022, at 12:30 PM IST. The theatrical film of that series titled Ekans – Hero Ek Villain Anek was launched on the channel on October 16, 2022.

On 3 December 2022, Pogo launched Dennis the Menace and Gnasher.

Programming

See also 
 HBO (India)
 WB Channel
 CNN International
 Tiny TV, a preschool programming block on Pogo.
 List of Indian animated television series
 List of programmes broadcast by Cartoon Network (India)

References

External links 
 Official website

Cartoon Network
Boomerang (TV network)
Television stations in Mumbai
Children's television channels in India
Indian animation
Television channels and stations established in 2004
2004 establishments in Maharashtra
Warner Bros. Discovery networks